Jawahar Nagar, named after the first Prime Minister of India, Jawaharlal Nehru, is a developed residential area in North Chennai, a metropolitan city in Tamil Nadu, India.

Location

Jawahar Nagar is located near (Kolathur, Chennai), Peravallur and Perambur.

Sub-neighborhoods

 Agaram
 Thiru.Vi.Ka. Nagar
 Periyar Nagar
 GKM Colony
 Loco scheme Colony
 Peravallur
 Sembium
 Anjugam Nagar
 Kumaran Nagar
 Villivakkam
 Perambur
 Kolathur

Roads and Streets

 Off Paper mills road
 Jawahar nagar first main road
 Jawahar nagar second main road
 Jawahar nagar third main road
 Jawahar nagar fourth main road
 Jawahar nagar fifth main road
 Jawahar nagar sixth main road
 SRP koil street (South)

Temple

 Sundararaja Perumal temple

Railway Station

 Perambur Loco works
 Perambur Carriage works

Surroundings

Neighbourhoods in Chennai